The 2020–21 Queens Park Rangers Football Club season is the club's 139th season in existence and the club's 6th consecutive season in the second division of English football. In addition to the domestic league, Queens Park Rangers participated in this season's editions of the FA Cup, and the EFL Cup.

Players

First team squad

Kit
Supplier: Erreà / Sponsor: Senate Bespoke

Kit information
QPR agreed a multi-year partnership with Erreà as the official technical kit suppliers, the 2020–21 season will be the fourth year of the deal. The kits will be 100 percent bespoke designs for the duration of the deal.

On 20 August 2020 QPR announced Football Index as the main shirt sponsor for the 2020–21 season on a one-year deal with an option for a further year.

On 12 March 2021 Football Index went into administration and the sponsorship deal with Queen's Park Rangers was cancelled, Senate Bespoke became the new shirt sponsor of Queen's Park Rangers.

Transfers

Transfers in

Loans in

Transfers out

Loans out

Pre-season and friendlies
For the 2020/21 season, QPR have announced pre-season friendlies against AFC Wimbledon and Oxford United.

Competitions

Overview

EFL Championship

League table

Results summary

Results by matchday

Matches
The 2020–21 season fixtures were released on 21 August.

FA Cup

The third round draw was made on 30th November, with Premier League and EFL Championship clubs all entering the competition.

EFL Cup

The first round draw was made on 18 August.

Squad statistics

Statistics

|-

|-
! colspan="14" style="background:#dcdcdc; text-align:center"| Out on Loan

|-
! colspan="14" style="background:#dcdcdc; text-align:center"| Left During the Season

|}

Goals

Clean sheets

Disciplinary record

Notes

References

External links

Queens Park Rangers F.C. seasons
Queens Park Rangers F.C.
Queens Park Rangers
Queens Park Rangers